The  Viola de arame is a stringed musical instrument from the Portuguese island of Madeira. It has 9 strings in 5 courses. The strings are made of steel.

Tuning
It is tuned G3 G2, D3 D2, G3 G3, B3, D3 D3. 

The two lowest courses are tuned in octaves. The three higher ones are tuned in unison. However, the 2nd highest course is a single string instead of a pair like the rest.

The scale length is about 560mm.

References

External links
 The Stringed Instrument Database 
 ATLAS of Plucked Instruments

String instruments
Portuguese musical instruments